The hairy sweep (Canephora hirsuta) is a moth of the family Psychidae. It is found in Europe. The female has no wings.

The wingspan of the male is 20–25 mm. The moth flies in one generation from May to July.

The larvae feed on shrubs, deciduous trees and herbaceous plants.

Notes
The flight season refers to Belgium and The Netherlands. This may vary in other parts of the range.

External links
Insects of Europe 
Microlepidoptera.nl 
Lepidoptera of Belgium

Psychidae
Moths of Japan
Moths of Europe
Moths of Asia